The Guardian of Paradise is an 1889 painting by the German artist Franz Stuck. It shows a glowing angel with bird-like wings and a flaming sword.

It was Stuck's first large oil painting. It was entered into the 1889 art exhibition at the Glaspalast in Munich, where it won a gold medal and 6000 Mark. The painting became a breakthrough for Stuck and made him a recognised symbolist artist.

It is kept at the Museum Villa Stuck in Munich.

References

External links
 Stuckstück: Der Wächter des Paradieses from Villa Stuck on Vimeo 

1889 paintings
Angels in art
Paintings by Franz von Stuck
Paintings in the collection of the Villa Stuck
Symbolist paintings